Ten referendums were held in Switzerland during 1998. The first three were held on 7 June on a federal resolution on a balanced budget and two popular initiatives "for the protection of life and environment against genetic engineering (Gene-protection initiative)" and "Switzerland without secret police". Whilst the balanced budget proposal was approved, both popular initiatives were rejected by voters. The next three referendums were held on 27 September on a federal law on truck tolls based on engine size (following the approval of a federal resolution on the matter in a 1994) and two popular initiatives "for well-priced foodstuffs and ecological farms" and "10th revision of the Aged and Bereaved Insurance without raising the retirement age". Whilst the toll law was approved, both initiatives were rejected.

The final set of referendums was held on 29 November on an amendment to the federal law on labour in trade and industry, two federal resolutions on building and financing public transport infrastructure and for a temporary article in the Swiss Federal Constitution on grain, as well as a popular initiative "for a prudential drug policy". All were approved except the popular initiative.

Results

See also 

 1998 Swiss gene-protection initiative

References

1998 elections in Switzerland
1998 referendums
Referendums in Switzerland